Dude food is a food trend largely consisting of heavy, meaty dishes that are thought to appeal to men or express masculinity. Dishes such as hamburgers, hot dogs, or barbecue ribs may be considered dude food, though dude food versions of these dishes often distinguish themselves with exaggerated use of specific ingredients such as whiskey, barbecue sauce, bacon, or cheese.

Development 
It is thought that the dude food trend originated in the early 2000s, most likely in the southern region of the United States.
A common theory is that the trend arose from the food truck and street food movements, which are defined by their offerings of easily accessible comfort food. The trend expanded as a social media phenomenon, and its associated term was eventually added to the Collins dictionary in 2016. Dude food has inspired a growing number of academic and non-academic literature with titles such as Dudefood: A Guy's Guide to Cooking Kick-Ass Food And Dude Food: Recipes for the Modern Guy. Although the trend has spread widely within the public consciousness, journalists, bloggers, and academics have struggled to coin a precise, widely accepted definition for “dude food.” The various proposed definitions share elements such as that of gender stereotypes, the predominance of meat-heavy dishes, and the exclusion of “feminine” types of food.

Increased awareness of the implications of high cholesterol diets, alongside other recent health findings suggesting that men are twice as likely as women to suffer severe heart problems, appear to have broadened dude food offerings to encompass light, vegetable-based options.

Geographical diffusion 
The trend is said to have originated in North America, and following its success, the trend has geographically expanded into other countries, reaching Europe, Oceania, and Asia. This concept also arrived in the United Kingdom, where it has influenced a number of “dude food” inspired restaurants which mix their British national dishes with “dude food” characteristics.

The same appears to be happening also in Australia, as a result of the dissatisfaction with fast food and the demand for higher-quality, but not necessarily 'healthy' food.

Dude food was considered to be one of the fastest-growing trends in the year 2018, soon arriving also in Japan, Influencing the usual healthy rice and fish-based cuisine and combining it with the more heavy and greasy style.

Dude food advertising 
Dude food advertising and representation tend to follow the traditional gender binary And can be analyzed from a visual perspective, taking into account how gender identity is represented in the food field. Thus, food is considered to be part of those products which are “gendered in a practice of normative sexual dualism reinforced and maintained within (…) cultural institutions of marketing communication and market segmentation”. According to this, advertising plays a significant role in defining this dualism concerning gender identity, since its language represents a tool contributing to the creation and reflection of social norms.

According to Katherine Parkin, the gender binary in advertising took shape in the 1950s, following the theories of Ernest Dichter. She believed “by convincing Americans of a food’s sex and its resultant gendered identity, as well as its sensuality, advertisers could suggest their foods to meet consumers’ need to fulfill their gender roles." And “Dichter believed that many people categorized the sex of foods. However, his own subscription to a gendered taxonomy of food is evident in his assessment of the findings”.

Moreover, it is notable that the food product itself as well as the related packaging and advertisement are employed as tools to transmit an idea of how men and women should eat and behave, in keeping with the findings of studies on dude food.

An example of advertising in England is the Ginsters (English food company) advertisement of a beef pasty accompanied by the hashtag #FeedTheMan, in which there is a man that tells a joke in front of his girlfriend’s bosses; but he is talking about Ginsters, thus she has nothing to worry about, because it’s a type of food that makes everyone agree.

In accordance with Lynsey Atkin, advertisement agencies and brands have honed in on a crisis of masculinity in our society and “in times of insecurity, brands can repurpose themselves as champions of the every man, facilitators of the macho clean, however small. In other words, promising gender-traditional-prowess, like being able to kick a football in a straight line, could be the media-constructed equivalent of helping you grow a beard. Some stereotypes, like male dominance in social situations, are invoked as a nostalgia (a dream of the football-playing and beard-growing of days gone by)".

In some places it can be hard to find an advertisement of men eating chocolate. However, in Canada there is an advertisement for chocolate bar Mr. Big Produced by Cadbury, in which the snack is over sexualized and associated with virility, with the slogan “When you're this big they call you Mister”.

Furthermore, specific events and moving tours were organized in Canada and promoted in order to provide dude food dishes and a certain atmosphere; they were born specifically to satisfy men's tastes, whereas women were welcomed but only as supporters of their men.

Gender and food 

According to the feminist scholar Judith Butler, gender is “an identity tenuously constituted in time (…) instituted through a stylized repetition of acts”. In fact, “performing food labor is intertwined with performing gender”. In particular, several studies focus on how certain foods, drinks, or ways of eating and drinking are interpreted as “masculine”; a crucial example of this attributed masculinity to certain types of food is represented by dude food. Significantly, scholars have been suggesting that this masculinization of food practices might allegedly be the expression of masculine privilege, which “manifests around food and cooking in a myriad of ways”. Dude food has been extremely crucial as it has raised the interest of the scholarly world as to why the Western cultural and social system defines gender by looking at people's food choices.

Meat is considered to be one of the most important ingredients of “manly” food, since meat conveys the meaning of “sexuality and virility”. Thus, if masculinity is related to meat, a mostly vegetarian diet is inevitably interpreted as feminine. Not only the consumption of meat, but also the various ways in which it is cooked, are associated with a specific idea of masculinity. For instance, barbecued meat and its consumption have always been seen as a rather masculine activity. There is a growing literature demonstrating how types of unhealthy food are interpreted to be masculine because of the presence, in our belief system, of cultural stereotypes according to which women tend to eat more healthily than men.

This differentiation could also be attributed to the packaging of food products. Strong stereotypes are also deeply embedded in people’s buying preferences. The cultural basis of these stereotypes regarding food choices and gender perception is the desire from part of our social system to protect and maintain its hegemonic masculine norms. The interest toward dude food is leading people to re-think about the reasons behind food choices and why it should be “enjoyed. With friends and family — male or female.”

See also 

Masculinity
Meat consumption
Meat consumption by country
Gender advertisement
Junk food
Street food

References

Further reading 
Patel, C.Rajeev, Food Sovereignty: power, gender and the right to food, PLoS Med 9(6): e1001223. 
Sassatelli, Roberta, Consumer Culture- History, Theory and Politics, Sage Publications, 2007
Wardle, Jane et al, Gender Differences in Food Choice: The contribution of Health Beliefs and Dieting in "Annals of Behavioural Medicine”, vol.27 (2): 107-116, Society of Behavioural Medicine, 2004
Wright, L., & Adams, C. (2015). The Vegan Studies Project: Food, Animals, and Gender in the Age of Terror. University of Georgia Press

Food and drink terminology
Masculinity